Syd Einfeld Drive is a six lane, partially elevated,  dual carriageway in Sydney, Australia. It was built as the Bondi Junction Bypass to bypass a section of Oxford Street through Bondi Junction from Woollahra to Old South Head Road.

Construction of the road included 26 span prestressed concrete viaduct at Bondi Junction, totalling  in length.

Construction commenced in February 1977, with the road opened on 9 January 1979 by local member of parliament Syd Einfeld. It was renamed Syd Einfeld Drive in February 1988. On 10 March 1989, a baby boy was born in an ambulance stopped on the road.
 
The County of Cumberland planning scheme had envisaged a freeway being built from the Sydney central business district to Bondi Junction. However, this was the only section of the road completed, being built in conjunction with the Eastern Suburbs railway line and Bondi Junction railway station.

References

Bondi Junction, New South Wales
Streets in Sydney
Transport infrastructure completed in 1979
1979 establishments in Australia